The Belarusian Women's Handball Championship is the premier league for women's handball clubs in Belarus. First held in 1993 following the collapse of the Soviet Union, it has been dominated since by BNTU Minsk, formerly known as Politechnik Minsk and No. 6 Minsk.

List of champions and medalists

1993 :
 Politechnik Minsk

 WWW Universitet Gomel

 RUOR Minsk

1994:
 Politechnik Minsk

 WWW Universitet Gomel
 
 Drut Belynychi
1995:
 Politechnik Minsk

 Politechnik-2 Minsk

 WWW Universitet Gomel
1996:
 Politechnik Minsk

 Politechnik-2 Minsk

 Universitet Gomel
1997:
 Politechnik Minsk

 Politechnik-RSWSM Minsk

 Universitet Gomel
1998:
 Politechnik Minsk

 Politechnik-RSWSM Minsk

 Drut Belynychi
1999:
 Politechnik Minsk

 Drut Belynychi

 RSWSM-RUOR Minsk
2000:
 No. 6 Minsk

 Drut Belynychi

 Arkatron Minsk
2001:
 No. 6 Minsk

 Drut Belynychi

 Arkatron Minsk
2002: 
 No. 6 Minsk 

 Drut Belynychi

 Arkatron Minsk
2003:
 BNTU Minsk

 HC Gorodnichanka

 Arkatron Minsk
2004: 
 BNTU Minsk

 HC Gorodnichanka 

 Arkatron Minsk
2005: 
 BNTU Minsk

 HC Gorodnichanka

 Drut Belynychi
2006: 
 BNTU Minsk

 HC Gorodnichanka

 Drut Belynychi

2007: 
 BNTU Minsk

 HC Gorodnichanka

 Drut Belynychi
2008:
 HC Gorodnichanka

 BNTU Minsk

 Arkatron Minsk
2009: 
 BNTU Minsk

 HC Gorodnichanka

 Drut Belynychi
2010: 
 BNTU Minsk

 HC Gorodnichanka

 Arkatron Minsk
2011:
 BNTU Minsk

 HC Gorodnichanka

 Arkatron Minsk
2012: 
 BNTU Minsk

 HC Gorodnichanka

 Arkatron Minsk
2013:
 BNTU Minsk

 HC Gorodnichanka

 HC Gomel
2014: 
 BNTU Minsk

 HC Gomel

 HC Gorodnichanka
2015: 
 BNTU Minsk

 HC Gomel

 HC Gorodnichanka
2016: 
 HC Gomel

 BNTU Minsk

 HC Gorodnichanka
2017:
 HC Gomel

 BNTU Minsk

 HC Victoria-Berestie
2018: 
 BNTU Minsk

 HC Gomel

 HC Gorodnichanka
2019: 
 HC Gomel

 BNTU Minsk

 HC Gorodnichanka
2020: 
 HC Gomel

 BNTU Minsk

 HC Gorodnichanka
2021:
 BNTU Minsk

 HC Gomel

 HC Victoria-Berestie

Summary

References

Women's handball leagues
Women's handball in Belarus
Women's sports leagues in Belarus
Professional sports leagues in Belarus